Andrew Low II (20 July 1812 – 27 June 1886) was a Scottish-American cotton merchant.

Early life
Low was born in Kincardineshire, Scotland on 20 July 1812. He was a son of William Low and Katherine ( Reid) Low.

Career
Low emigrated from Scotland to Savannah, Georgia, in 1829 at 17 years old to work for his uncle, also named Andrew. In 1839, his uncle retired back to England, and the young Low was in charge of the cotton firm, eventually becoming "the premier cotton merchant in pre-Civil War Savannah" becoming the richest man there. After his uncle died in 1849, he inherited all of his uncle's property and businesses in Savannah and in Liverpool. The firm, known as Andrew Low & Co. in Savannah and Isaac Low & Co. in Liverpool, had a fleet of cargo ships, which carried cotton from their warehouse, the Scott and Balfour Stores, on the river in Savannah to England where he maintained an office in Liverpool. 

He was also a director of the Merchants National Bank and the Central Railroad.

Personal life

In 1844 Low was married to Sarah Cecil Hunter (1817–1849), a daughter of Alexander Hunter and Harriet ( Bellinger) Hunter. Together, they were the parents of three children: Andrew Low, who died young, Amy Low and Harriet Low.

In 1854 Low remarried to Mary Cowper Stiles (1832–1863), a daughter of U.S. Representative William Henry Stiles and Elizabeth Ann ( Mackay) Stiles. Her father also served as U.S. Chargé to the Austrian Empire. Together, they were the parents of:

 Katie Mackay Low (1855–1923), who died unmarried.
 Mary Cowper Low (1859–1932), who married David Charles Guthrie V of East Haddon Hall in 1891.
 William MacKay Low (1860–1905), who married Juliette Magill Gordon in 1886; she later founded the Girl Scouts of the USA; he lived at Wellesbourne House in England.
 Jessie Low (1862–1934), who married Hugh Graham, a son of Sir Frederick Graham, 3rd Baronet and Lady Jane Seymour (a daughter of Edward Seymour, 12th Duke of Somerset, and wife Jane Georgiana Sheridan), in 1888.

The Andrew Low House, part of the Juliette Gordon Low Historic District, is at 330 Drayton Street in Savannah. Low hosted Thackery at his mansion at 329 Abercorn Street.
 
Low died on 27 June 1886 at his home, Beauchamp Hall, Leamington Spa in Warwickshire, England. His body was returned to American and he was buried alongside his wives at Savannah's Laurel Grove Cemetery.

Descendants
Through his daughter Jessie, he was posthumously a grandfather of four, Ronald Andrew Hugh Graham, Sybil Hattie Hermione Graham, Murial Mary Graham and Alastair Hugh Graham (1904–1982), an Oxford friend of Evelyn Waugh who was considered an inspiration for Sebastian Flyte in Brideshead Revisited.

References
Notes

Sources

External links
Low, Andrew, 1813-1886.

1812 births
1886 deaths
Scottish emigrants to the United States
People from Savannah, Georgia
19th-century American merchants